Tanak-e Olya (also Romanized as Ţanāk-e ‘Olyā; also known as Tanāk-e Bālā, Ţanak Bālā, Ţanāk-e Bālā, and Tenak Bālā) is a village in Mud Rural District, Mud District, Sarbisheh County, South Khorasan Province, Iran. At the 2006 census, its population was 107, in 31 families.

References 

Populated places in Sarbisheh County